Euxesta avala is a species of fly in the genus Euxesta of the family Ulidiidae. Originally named Trypeta avala by Francis Walker in 1849, it was later completely revised as a species of Euxesta.

References

avala
Insects described in 1849